Braone (Camunian:  or ) is an Italian comune of 672 inhabitants in Val Camonica, province of Brescia, in Lombardy.
 
It is bounded by other communes of Breno, Cerveno, Ceto, Losine, Niardo.

History

In 1956 coins were discovered in Braone, the latest of which date back to Anastasius I (circa 518 CE).

Main sights

 Parish Church of the Purification of the Virgin Mary, reported already in 1439, has a stone portal Sarnico of the eighteenth century.  The altarpiece is by Fiammenghino.

References

External links

 - Lombardia Beni Culturali

Cities and towns in Lombardy